Anna Serra Salamé (born 1968 in Barcelona) is a Catalan long-distance runner from Alt Urgell. She was champion of the Skyrunner World Series in 2004.

External links 
 Results

References

Living people
Sportswomen from Catalonia
Spanish female long-distance runners
1968 births
Athletes from Barcelona
Spanish sky runners